Kornisi (Q'ornisi) or Znaur (Znawyr) is a rural locality in South Caucasus, claimed by the Republic of Georgia and controlled by the breakaway Republic of South Ossetia. Georgian government recognizes Kornisi as daba in Kareli Municipality of Shida Kartli region. According to the administrative division of South Ossetia, Znaur is the administrative center of Znaur district.

In Kornisi, the woodworking and food industries are developed, and the following infrastructure facilities are present and operating: a library, hospital, pharmacy, preschool and school education.

References

Populated places in Znaur District